Șoimuș may refer to several places in Romania:

Șoimuș, a commune in Hunedoara County
 Șoimuș, a village in Rădeşti Commune, Alba County
 Șoimuș, a village administered by Lipova town, Arad County
 Șoimuș, a village in Remetea Commune, Bihor County
 Șoimuș, a village in Șieu Commune, Bistriţa-Năsăud County
 Șoimuș, a village in Coroisânmărtin Commune, Mureș County
 Șoimuș, a village in Someș-Odorhei Commune, Sălaj County
 Buceava-Șoimuș, a village in Brazii Commune, Arad County
 Șoimușu Mare and Șoimușu Mic, villages in Săcel Commune, Harghita County
 Șoimușeni, a village in Letca Commune, Sălaj County
 Șoimuș (Someș), a tributary of the Someș in Sălaj County
 Șoimuș (Crișul Negru), a tributary of the Valea Roșie in Bihor County
 Șoimuș, a tributary of the Sighișoara in Arad County
 Șoimuș, a tributary of the Dunărița in Alba County

See also 
 Șoimeni (disambiguation)
 Șoimu (disambiguation)